Sheehan Glacier is a steep and extremely broken glacier draining from the vicinity of Miller Peak in the Explorers Range, Bowers Mountains, Antarctica, and entering the Rennick Glacier just south of Alvarez Glacier. Named by the northern party of New Zealand Geological Survey Antarctic Expedition (NZGSAE), 1963–64, for Maurice Sheehan, mountaineer who wintered at Scott Base in 1963, and was a field party assistant with the expedition.

Further reading 
 Edmund Stump, The Ross Orogen of the Transantarctic Mountains, P 55
 Gunter Faure, Teresa M. Mensing, The Transantarctic Mountains: Rocks, Ice, Meteorites and Water, P 120

External links 

  Sheehan Glacier at USGS website
  Sheehan Glacier at the New Zealand Antarctic Gazette website
  Sheehan Glacier at AADC website
  Sheehan Glacier at SCAR website
 A map of the Sheehan Glacier area
 Long term weather forecast
 

Glaciers of Pennell Coast